Sai Hsai Mao (born 1948 in Muse, Burma), also known as Sai Saing Maw, is a distinguished Burmese singer and musician of Shan descent. The most prominent singer of Shan pop music, he is known for his prolific cover songs and is based in Thailand, which is home to a large Shan community. Throughout his career, he has also released 10 Burmese language albums.

Sai Hsai Mao gained popularity after 1968, when a Shan language program on Radio Thailand broadcast his music. From 1973 to 1976, he was associated with the Shan State Army - East. His most famous song, "Lik Hom Mai Panglong" (Panglong Agreement), was composed by Sai Kham Leik in 1973.

Discography 

 Kau Yon Pe Tang
 Tender Cherry Leaf Songs (ချယ်ရီရွက်နုတေးများ)
 Father's Son (အဖေ့ရဲ့သား)

References

External links 

 Tribute to Sai Htee Saing

20th-century Burmese male singers
1948 births
Burmese people of Shan descent
People from Shan State
Burmese musicians
Living people